HMS Stygian (pennant number P249) was a S-class submarine of the British Royal Navy, and the only ship so far to bear the name. The boat is listed as being a member of the fourth group, although she had the external stern torpedo tube fitted as in the third group.

After an eventful career in the Pacific during the Second World War, she was sold to be broken up for scrap on 28 October 1949, and finally scrapped by Metal Industries of Ardgour in August 1950.

Career

On being commissioned, HMS Stygian was under the command of Lt. G.S.C. Clarabut, RN.  She was assigned to operate with the Eastern Fleet in the Pacific Ocean.  She had a short, but eventful wartime career, sinking eight Japanese sailing vessels, five Japanese coasters, six unidentified Japanese vessels and the ship Nichinan Maru .  She also sank the Japanese auxiliary minesweeper Wa 104 (the former Dutch Djember) and damaged the Japanese auxiliary submarine chaser Cha 104 off Bali.

Notes

References
 
  
 
 
 

 

British S-class submarines (1931)
1943 ships
World War II submarines of the United Kingdom
Ships built on the River Mersey
Royal Navy ship names